Ankara Keçiörengücü SK is a Turkish sports club based in the Keçiören district of Ankara. The football club plays in the TFF First League.

History
Keçiörengücü was founded as Hacettepe with black-white colours in 1945. Hacettepe was one of Turkish First League's founder teams. They played in the First League between 1958–1960 and 1962–1968. After relegation from the First League in 1967–68 season, they played second level between 1968–1971. They were relegated to the Third League in 1970–71 season. They played in the Third League between 1971–1974, 1977–1978, and 1984–1988. The club was renamed  Hacettepe Yeni Camuzoğluspor in 1985. Finally they took the name Keçiörengücü and changed their colors to dark red-white in 1988. Keçiörengücü played in the Second League between 1989–1993 and 1997–1998. Keçiörengücü became champions in the Third Group of the Third League and was promoted to League B in 2006. However, it was relegated to the Third League after a 5–1 loss to Darıca Gençlerbirliği, in an away match on May 13, 2007. The club have played again in the TFF Second League since 2014. In May 2019, they gained promotion to TFF First League as champion of White Group in the TFF Second League.

League attendances
 Turkish Super League: 1958–60, 1962–68 (as Hacettepe)
 TFF First League: 1968–71 (as Hacettepe), 1989–93, 1997–98, 2019–
 TFF Second League: 1971–74 (as Hacettepe), 1977–78 (as Hacettepe), 1984–89 (1984-85 as Hacettepe, 1985-88 as Hacettepe Yeni Camuzoğluspor & 1988-89 as Keçiörengücü), 1993–97, 1998–01, 2006–07, 2014–19
 TFF Third League: 2001–06, 2007–2014
 Turkish Regional Amateur League: 1960–62, 1974–77 (as Hacettepe, 1978–84 (as Hacettepe)

Players

Current squad

Out on loan

References

External links
Official website
Keçiörengücü on TFF.org

 
Football clubs in Turkey
Football clubs in Ankara
Association football clubs established in 1987
1987 establishments in Turkey
Süper Lig clubs